DuMonde was a German trance duo, consisting of Jürgen Mutschall (a.k.a. DJ Jam X) and Dominik De Leon (a.k.a. De Leon).

Discography

Albums
 A Decade 1997–2007 (2007)

Compilation albums
 Techno Club Vol. 12, with Talla 2XLC
 On Stage 2004 (Chapter 1)

Singles
 "Can U Dig It?" (1998)
 "Tomorrow" (1998) – UK #60 (in 2001)
 "Fly to the Sky" (1999) with Anastasia
 "See the Light" (1999)
 "Just Feel Free" (2000)
 "Memory" (2001) with Lange
 "Never Look Back" (2001) – UK #36
 "God Music" (2002)
 "Human" (2003)
 "Cold" (2004)
 "Ich Will Raus / Let Me Out" (2004)
 "Kalt" (2004)
 "Singularity 2005" (2005) with Dave 202
 "What's in Your Head" (2005) with Judge Jules
 "I Feel You" (2006)
 "Tomorrow 2006" (2006)
 "Gun" (2007)
 "Elektrisch" (2008)

Remixes
 Tony H – "Zoo Future"
 Lange – "Follow Me"
 Push – "Universal Nation"
 M.U.T.E. – "Missed Beat"
 Sash! – "Adelante!"
 Green Court – "Follow Me"
 Jurgen Vries – The Theme
 Alice Deejay – "Better Off Alone"
 Alice Deejay – "Back in My Life"
 Azzido Da Bass – "Dooms Night"
 Barthezz – "On the Move"
 Ayumi Hamasaki – "Trauma"
 Every Little Thing – "Rescue Me"
 Binary Finary – "2000"
 Fragma – "Everytime You Need Me"
 Angelic – "Can't Keep Me Silent"
 Hurley & Todd – "Sunstorm"
 Rank 1 – "Symsonic"
 CRW – "I Feel Love"
 Fragma – "Everytime You Need Me"
 Steve Morley – "Reincarnations"
 Captain Jack - "Dream a Dream"

References

External links
 Jam X Myspace
 De Leon Myspace
 DuMonde Myspace

German trance music groups
German electronic music groups
German musical duos
Remixers
Electronic dance music duos